Kunwar Mahmud Ali Khan  (16 June 1920 – 22 April 2001) was an Indian politician born in the village of Jogipura, Meerut. He was an Advocate by profession and a farmer. He did BA LLB from Meerut College, Meerut, Uttar Pradesh.

Political career

Governor of Madhya Pradesh (1990–93)
Member of Uttar Pradesh Legislative Assembly Congress Party Daasna constituency (1957–62)
Member of Uttar Pradesh Public Service Commission (1968–74)
Re-entered active politics in 1974
Active involvement in Lok Nayak Jaya Prakash Narayan Movement (1974–77)
Detained during Emergency under MISA (June 1975 to January 1977)
Lok Sabha Member Janata Party from Hapur constituency (1977–80)
Member of Central Haj Committee
Member of AMU court
Member of Government Assurances Committee
Member of the Consultative Committee on Law, Justice and Company Affairs
Member of National Language Committee
Leader of Indian delegation to Russia on Indo-Soviet Friendship Committee
Deputy Leader of Janata Parliamentary Party in Lok Sabha (1979)
Member of Janata Party Central Parliamentary Board
Member of Chandrashekhar-led Janata Party

References

1920 births
2001 deaths
Janata Party politicians
Governors of Madhya Pradesh
Bharatiya Lok Dal politicians
Janata Dal politicians